is a former Japanese football player.

Club statistics

References

External links

1978 births
Living people
Saga University alumni
Association football people from Kumamoto Prefecture
Japanese footballers
J2 League players
Japan Football League players
FC Ryukyu players
Giravanz Kitakyushu players
Association football midfielders